The men's welterweight boxing competition at the 2016 Summer Olympics in Rio de Janeiro was held from 7–17 August at the Riocentro.

Schedule 
All times are Brasília Time (UTC−3).

Results

Finals

Top half

Bottom half

References

Boxing at the 2016 Summer Olympics
Men's events at the 2016 Summer Olympics